BANGER.  is a 2022 Czech Musical drama film directed by Adam Sedlák. It premiered at Karlovy Vary International Film Festival on 5 July 2022. The story follows a young drug dealer who is obsessed and blinded by the desire to become famous as a rapper, to produce a rap hit - a banger. The film was created in 15 shooting days and was shot entirely on a mobile phone.

Cast
Adam Mišík as Alex
Marsell Bendig as Láďa
Anna Fialová as Alex's girlfriend
Sergei Barracuda as himself
Jan Révai
Sára Rychlíková
David Černý

References

External links
 
 BANGER. at CSFD.cz 

2022 films
2022 drama films
2020s Czech-language films
Czech musical drama films